The 2017 LNBP Playoffs is the postseason tournament of the Liga Nacional de Baloncesto Profesional's 2016–17 season.

Bracket

First round
All times are in Central Zone (UTC−06:00)

Semifinals

Finals

External links
Official website

playoff